The elegant snake-eyed skink (Cryptoblepharus pulcher) is a species of lizard in the family Scincidae. It is endemic to southern and eastern Australia.

References

Cryptoblepharus
Reptiles described in 1918
Taxa named by Richard Sternfeld
Skinks of Australia
Endemic fauna of Australia